As of 2021, thirteen Nobel Prize laureates have been Muslims, more than half in the 21st century. Seven of the thirteen  laureates have been awarded the Nobel Peace Prize, while three have been for the sciences. The recipient of the 1979 Nobel Prize in Physics, Abdus Salam, was a member of the Ahmadi community of Pakistan. Aziz Sancar is the second Turkish Nobel laureate and was awarded the Nobel prize in Chemistry in the field of molecular biology in 2015.

Chemistry
Two Muslims have been awarded the Nobel Prize in Chemistry.

Literature
Three Muslims have been awarded the Nobel Prize in Literature.

Peace
Seven Muslims have been awarded the Nobel Peace Prize.

Physics
One Muslim has been awarded the Nobel Prize in Physics.

By Country

Further reading

Articles
 Mysticism in Contemporary Islamic Political Thought: Orhan Pamuk and Abdolkarim Soroush by John von Heyking, University of Lethbridge
 "Islam, Melancholy, and Sad, Concrete Minarets: The Futility of Narratives" in Orhan Pamuk's The Black Book by Ian Almond

Books
 The Age of Deception: Nuclear Diplomacy in Treacherous Times by Mohamed El Baradei.
Islam, Orientalism and Intellectual History: Modernity and the Politics of Exclusion since Ibn Khaldun (Library of Middle East History) by Mohammad R. Salama .
 Orhan Pamuk and the Politics of Turkish Identity: From Islam to Istanbul by Erdag Goknar, Routledge Publication.

Biography
Cosmic Anger: Abdus Salam – The First Muslim Nobel Scientist. by Gordon Fraser , .
 Yasser Arafat (Biography (Lerner Hardcover)) by George Headlam. .
 Anwar Sadat: Visionary Who Dared by Joseph Finklestone.

Autobiography
 Iran Awakening: One Woman's Journey to Reclaim Her Life and Country (2007) by Shirin Ebadi.
 Ahmed Zewail Autobiography.
Banker to the Poor: The Autobiography of Muhammad Yunus, Founder of Grameen Bank. .

See also
 List of Nobel Peace Laureates
 List of Hindu Nobel Laureates
 List of black Nobel Laureates
 List of Jewish Nobel laureates
 List of Christian Nobel laureates
 List of Nobel laureates by country
 List of Nobel laureates
 List of female Nobel laureates

References

The year of receiving Nobel Prize is given after each Nobel Laureate in this article. For verification of candidacy of above listed Nobel Laureates, please go to nobelprize.org, and search the corresponding year of reception of Nobel Prize in the respective field.

References

External links

 “Nobel Laureates and the Muslim World” by Saleem H. Ali, Newsvine, February 14, 2010
 “Nobel laureates of the Islamic world” - S Iftikhar Murshed, The News International, April 3, 2011
 “Professor Abdus Salam”
 “No Nobels for the Muslim World” by Aziz Akhmad, The Express Tribune, October 6, 2011
 “Abdus Salam, 'First Muslim Nobel Laureate'”, ‘The Culture Trip’. (Abdus Salam was a theoretical physicist who became the first Pakistani and the first Muslim to be awarded the Nobel Prize in the sciences.)
 “Dr. Abdus Salam: Nobel Laureate in Physics”
 “Tawakul Karman speaks: Islam Supports Democracy”, 'Onislam', December 10, 2011
 “A Muslim woman's place is in society: Nobel Laureate”, France 24, November 2, 2009
  “Nobel Prize reflects women's struggle in the Muslim world”
 “Nobel Peace Prize Winner Tawakkul Karman Profile: The Mother of Yemen's revolution”, The Huffington Post, October 7, 2011
"Nobel Prize winner highlights women’s role in Arab Spring" The Michigan Daily. November 15, 2011
“Nobel Peace Prize Winner Tawakul Karman: Islam No Threat to Democracy”, reprinted ‘Positive Islam’, December 12, 2011, 1st printed Reuters December 9, 2011
 “The Nobel Prize – Muslim Winners”, by Sadaqat
 “Women Nobel Peace Laureates Congratulate Three New Women Laureates”, Nobel Women's Initiative, October 7, 2011
 “Pamuk on Multiculturalism, Secularism, Islam, and the EU ”,‘Turkish Politics in Action’, January 18, 2009
“Two Souls – In Europe And Turkey”, an interview with Orhan Pamuk by Nathan Gardels,‘Nobel Laureates Plus’,NPQ, November 28, 2006
“Nobel author bridges Islam and the West” by Mark Feeney, The Boston Globe, October 13, 2006
“Listen to the damned” by Orhan Pamuk, The Guardian, September 29, 2001
“Muhammad Yunus addresses Islamic finance forum ” by Talal Malik,‘ Arabian Business’, April 13, 2008
‘Anwar Sadat’, about.com
“Thirty years later, Sadat's widow still hopes for peace”, CNN, March 26, 2009
“The Tragedy of Muslim Civilization” by Aftab Zaidi, Nirmukta, November 13, 2011
“Naguib Mahfouz and modern ‘Islamic identity’” by ‘Mehnaz Mona Afridi’, UNISA, November 2008
 Malak, Amin, “The Qur’anic Paradigm and the Renarration of Empire: Abdulrazak Gurnah’s Paradise” in Muslim Narratives and the Discourse of English. – Albany : State University of New York Press, 2005

Nobel laureates
Muslim Nobel Laureates
Muslim

he:ערבים זוכי פרס נובל